Rewriting Extinction is a global 12-month campaign to raise money and awareness for both the climate and the biodiversity crisis through comics and videos. The money is donated to seven specific projects that tackle biodiversity issues with the goal of solving them within the twelve months of the campaign.

Project
Rewriting Extinction was founded by Paul Goodenough in 2019 and the campaign was officially launched in June 2021. It is targeting the wider population with comics, videos and the help of over 300 storytellers and celebrities such as Cara Delavingne, Richard Curtis, Ricky Gervais and Taika Waititi. The campaign is accompanied by the book The Most Important Comic Book on Earth: Stories to Save the World which was released on October 28th, 2021. The book includes 120 stories and comics about the climate and the biodiversity crisis from over 300 contributors including leading environmentalists, artists, authors, actors, filmmakers, musicians, drag performers and more. The comics are being released on an ongoing basis and translated into multiple languages. and are being translated into multiple languages.

The accompanying book, The Most Important Comic Book on Earth: Stories to Save the World, was released in October 2021, was created in collaboration with comic artists and celebrities as well as leading environmentalists.

The Projects
Rewriting Extinction is raising awareness for many different causes, but the financial donations are being distributed to seven different projects by seven different charities including:

Born Free- to expose the truth behind international wildlife trade by conserving gorillas and tigers, teaching communities and landscaping ecosystems.
The Wildlife Trusts– to repopulate the beaver population in the UK by rewilding landscapes.
World Land Trust-to protect the vital ecosystem of the Laguna Grande Reserve in Guatemala.
Rewilding Europe-to restore ecosystems in Europe and give wildlife a chance to fight back and increase populations.
Greenpeace- to reduce biodiversity loss in the world’s oceans.
Re:wild - to restore critical wild areas with a focus on two unique ecosystems: East Australian forests damaged by wildfires and the Annamite Mountains of Vietnam and Laos to save the last remaining Saola.
Reserva, the Youth Land Trust, to maintain the ecosystem in Ecuador, which is being damaged by deforestation.

References

External links 

Climate change
Climate justice